Chicka is a nickname that is associated with the name Charles. People known by that name include the following:
 Brian Moore (rugby league) (1944–2014), Australian former rugby league footballer and coach
 Charles Cahill (rugby league) (1916–2007), Australian rugby league footballer
 Charles Chicka Dixon (1928–2010), Australian Aboriginal activist and leader
John Ferguson (rugby league) (born 1954), Australian rugby league 
 Charles Kell (1905-1964), Australian rugby league player

See also

Chic (nickname)
Chica (name)
Chick (nickname)
 Chika (Igbo given name)
 Chika (Japanese given name)
Chika (general name)
Chickie (nickname)